Río Frío Airport  is an airport serving the settlement of Río Frío, in the Los Lagos Region of Chile.

The runway is up a narrow valley of the Frío River, a small tributary of the Manso River (es). There is close mountainous terrain in all quadrants, and the valley sides limit maneuvering.

See also

Transport in Chile
List of airports in Chile

References

External links
OpenStreetMap - Río Frío
OurAirports - Río Frío
FallingRain - Río Frío Airport

Airports in Chile
Airports in Los Lagos Region